Operation Phantom Thunder began on 16 June 2007, when Multi-National Force-Iraq launched major offensive operations against al-Qaeda and other extremist terrorists operating throughout Iraq. Operation Phantom Thunder was a corps level operation, including Operation Arrowhead Ripper in Diyala Province, Operation Marne Torch and Operation Commando Eagle in Babil Province, Operation Fardh al-Qanoon in Baghdad, Operation Alljah in Anbar Province, and continuing special forces actions against the Mahdi Army in southern Iraq and against Al-Qaeda leadership throughout the country. The operation was one of the biggest military operations in Iraq since the U.S. invasion in 2003.

Background

In mid-October 2006, al-Qaeda announced the creation of Islamic state of Iraq (ISI), replacing the Mujahideen Shura Council (MSC) and its al-Qaeda in Iraq (AQI).

From January to June 2007, as part of the "surge", an additional five U.S. brigades arrived in Iraq and were deployed throughout the Baghdad Belts in preparation for the upcoming operation. At the same time, U.S. forces launched "shaping" operations to set the conditions for the operation.

On 14 June, the Diyala Operational Command was established, an Iraqi corps-level command allowing coordination between Iraqi security forces throughout Diyala.

The Operation

U.S. and Iraqi forces launched attacks on Baghdad's northern and southern flanks mid-June to clear out Sunni insurgents, al-Qaida fighters and Shiite militiamen who had fled the capital and Anbar during the four-month-old security operation. The U.S. wanted to take advantage of the arrival of the final brigade of 30,000 additional U.S. troops to open the concerted attacks.

Operation "Imposing Law"

Operation Imposing Law had already begun on 14 February in an attempt to take back Baghdad which had come more than 70 percent under insurgent control. It became part of Phantom Thunder when that operation started and during the period of Phantom Thunder 311 insurgents, including 26 bombers, were killed in fighting in Baghdad.

Operation "Marne Torch"

Operation Marne Torch began on 16 June in the Arab Jabour and Salman Pak area, conducted by the new Multinational Division Central. Arab Jabour, being only 20 kilometers southeast from Baghdad, is a major transit point for insurgent forces in and out of Baghdad. By 14 August, 2,500 Coalition and Iraqi forces had detained more than five dozen suspected extremists, destroyed 51 boats, killed 88 terrorists and discovered and destroyed 51 weapons caches.

Operation "Arrowhead Ripper"

Operation Arrowhead Ripper began on 18 June, when Multi-National Division-North commenced offensive operations against Al-Qaeda positions in Baquba in Diyala province where fighting had already been going on for months. The operation started with air assaults under the cover of darkness in Baquba. Heavy street fighting lasted throughout the first day of the operation, mainly in the center of the city and around the main city market. On 22 June, Coalition attack helicopters killed 17 al-Qaeda gunmen and the vehicle they were using southwest of Khalis in Diyala province. By 19 August, at least 227 insurgents had been killed in Baquba.

Operation "Commando Eagle"

Operation Commando Eagle began on 21 June in the Mahmudiyah region southwest of Baghdad, conducted by Multinational Division Central. This region contains the notorious Triangle of Death and was the location where three US soldiers were kidnapped in mid-May 2007. The operation resulted in 31 detainees and the seizure of multiple large weapons caches. The operation was described as "a mix of helicopter borne air assaults and Humvee-mounted movements."

Operation "Alljah"

Operation Alljah was conducted by Multi-National Forces West. In the western Al Anbar province operations attacked insurgent supply lines and weapons caches, targeting the regions of Fallujah, Karma and Tharthar. Commanders of the operation expressed belief that Fallujah would be cleared by August and that the regions of Karma and Tharthar would be cleared by July. On 17 June, a raid near Karma killed a known Libyan Al-Qaeda fighter and six of his aides and on 21 June six al-Qaeda members were killed and five were detained during early-morning raids also near Karma. On 23 June, a U.S. airstrike killed five suspects and destroyed their car bomb near Fallujah. Insurgents also struck back in Fallujah with two suicide bombings and an attack on an off-duty policeman that left four policemen dead on 22 June. On 29 June, U.S. forces killed a senior al-Qaeda leader east of Fallujah. Abu 'Abd al-Rahman al-Masri, an Egyptian, was a veteran of both battles of Fallujah. On 6 July, a raid west of Fallujah resulted in the killing of an Al-Qaeda in Iraq battalion commander and two of his men and the captured of two more insurgents.

Actions taken against the Mahdi Army
On 21 June, a joint Iraqi-American operation commenced near Hilla to capture or kill members of Moktada al-Sadr's Mahdi Army. Iraqi Special Forces raided Sadr City and captured a "key insurgent leader" on 20 June, along with two associates.

Additional operations
Numerous smaller operations had also been conducted against insurgents, which included attacks on retreating insurgent forces from Baquba in the town of Khalis and other insurgents targets throughout Diyala province. In the fighting in Diyala province, an additional 234 insurgents were killed by 14 August beside those killed in operation Arrowhead Ripper, mainly in clashes in and around the town of Khalis. The fiercest of the clashes happened when the U.S.-allied insurgent group 1920th revolution brigade and Al-Qaeda fought a battle at Shrween village in Muqdadiya on 4 July killing 20 members of Al-Qaeda in Iraq.

Operation conclusion
On 14 August, it was announced that the operation ended. Coalition and Iraqi security forces pushed into areas previously not under their control, and they also ejected insurgent groups from their strongholds in Northern Babil, eastern Anbar and Diyala provinces and on the southern outskirts of Baghdad. During the operation, Iraqi and Coalition forces conducted intelligence raids against al Qaeda in Iraq and the Iranian-backed cells nationwide, with a heavy emphasis on cells in Baghdad, Diyala, and central and northern Iraq. Operation Arrowhead Ripper continued for another five days until 19 August with more intense street fighting in Baquba. The operations continued into operation Phantom Strike.

Military units involved

US forces reported to be involved were
 3rd Stryker Brigade Combat Team, 2nd Infantry Division
 4th Stryker Brigade Combat Team, 2nd Infantry Division
 3rd Brigade Combat Team, 1st Cavalry Division
 2nd Brigade Combat Team, 3rd Infantry Division
 3rd Brigade Combat Team, 3rd Infantry Division
 4th Brigade Combat Team, 25th Infantry Division
 25th Combat Aviation Brigade
 2nd Brigade Combat Team, 10th Mountain Division
 13th Marine Expeditionary Unit
 Regimental Combat Team 2
 Regimental Combat Team 6
 Task Force 88
Iraqi forces reported to be involved were
 1st Division
 4th Division
 5th Division
 1st Iraqi National Police Mechanized Brigade

See also

 Iraq War troop surge of 2007
 Operation Fardh al-Qanoon
 Operation Marne Torch
 Operation Arrowhead Ripper
 Operation Commando Eagle
 Operation Phantom Strike
 Operation Phantom Phoenix
 Coalition military operations of the Iraq War

References

External links
 Bill Roggio- Battle of Baquba 
 Bill Roggio- Battle of Iraq 
 MNF-Iraq- Operation Phantom Thunder
 Stars and Stripes- U.S. Troops Take the Offensive in Baqouba
 Bill Roggio- From Phantom Thunder to Phantom Strike 

Military operations of the Iraq War involving the United States
Military operations of the Iraq War involving Iraq
Military operations of the Iraq War in 2007
Iraqi insurgency (2003–2011)
United States Marine Corps in the Iraq War
June 2007 events in Iraq
July 2007 events in Iraq
August 2007 events in Iraq